Llewellyn Park is a neighborhood in West Orange in Essex County, New Jersey, United States.

History

Llewellyn Park was founded in 1853 by Llewellyn Solomon Haskell, a New York City businessman and was designed by Alexander Jackson Davis. Haskell discovered the lush, wooded area on the eastern slope on the first range of the Watchung Mountains which was originally farmland owned by Ira Harrison Condit. Purchasing 100 acres from Condit in 1855, Haskell set out to create a suburban community of country estates. These finely crafted homes would stand amid majestic trees and running streams. The first annual meeting of proprietors was held at the Park's Gatehouse on January 1, 1858, and continues today.

Llewellyn Park was one of the first planned suburbs in the United States, where natural beauty was both carefully cultivated and allowed to remain undisturbed. The landscaping is in the 19th century romantic style of New York's Central Park, and includes winding paths, ornamental trees, shrubs, and flowers.

The Park became home to many residents of note, especially Thomas Edison, whose home Glenmont is part of the Thomas Edison National Historical Park. Other residents over the years included abolitionist James Miller McKim, whose charming house contained secret chambers to hide escaped slaves traversing the Underground Railroad, the Merck family (George W. Merck was raised there), and the Colgate family.

Its annual meeting, going on for 158 years, is the longest continuous string of meetings of any residential association in the United States.

A number of Llewellyn Park's homes were designed by prominent American architects including Alexander Jackson Davis, Calvert Vaux, Charles McKim, Stanford White, and Robert A.M. Stern.

The main entrance to Llewellyn Park is located on Main Street in West Orange, near Thomas Edison's factory complex, now a museum and also a part of the Thomas Edison National Historical Park. The entrance is within West Orange's historic district, which is entering a phase of major revitalization. There is a side entrance to Llewellyn Park located on Eagle Rock Avenue that is electronically monitored and activated by the security guards within the Gatehouse on the Main Street entrance.

Llewellyn Park residents enjoy the combination of close proximity to New York City, a relaxed semi-rural lifestyle, and exceptional privacy.

Community
The Ramble is a common area of  landscaped with streams and paths.  Period gas lamps line the curving streets of the community.  The Llewellyn Park Ladies Association is largely responsible for the beautification of the Park. Its activities include annual plantings; purchasing, and selecting appropriate sites for rustic architecture including gazebos and benches; and directing the Park's maintenance staff to care for the trees, shrubs and flowers.

A major function of the Ladies Association is its commitment to fostering a sense of community among Park residents by planning social activities for adults and children. These activities include a Halloween Party for the children and a Holiday Party for adults. Recently the Ladies Association has also sponsored a barn dance, an Easter egg hunt, a Victorian picnic, and a High Tea.  Residents' professions and occupations range widely and include business persons, professionals, academics, and artists.

Residents operate a Llewellyn Park Historical Society dedicated to preserving historic artifacts relating to the creation and history of the Park.

The Llewellyn Park Preservation Foundation (an independent 501 c(3) charitable organization) is dedicated to maintaining and restoring the historic character of Llewellyn Park.

References

External links
 Llewellyn Park Homepage

1853 establishments in New Jersey
Gated communities in New Jersey
Neighborhoods in New Jersey
Populated places on the Underground Railroad
Populated places established in 1853
Populated places in Essex County, New Jersey
West Orange, New Jersey